Martyr's Memorial 'B' Division League (Nepali: शहीद स्मारक बी डिभिजन लीग) is the second tier of the association football league of Nepal football league system after the Martyr's Memorial A-Division League. It was established in 2003 and is run by the All Nepal Football Association. It is currently being held in ANFA Complex.

Structure 
The league is formatted as a single round-robin tournament with the top two team getting promoted to the Martyr's Memorial A-Division League and the bottom two teams relegated to the Martyr's Memorial C-Division League. This structure has not remained constant however as the league structure is changed every year by the All Nepal Football Association.

Current teams

Results

See also

 Martyr's Memorial A-Division League
 All Nepal Football Association

Notes

References

 
3
Nepal
2003 establishments in Nepal